Gore Bay-Manitoulin Airport  is located  west southwest of Gore Bay, in the township of Gordon/Barrie Island, Ontario, Canada.

The airport is classified as an airport of entry by Nav Canada and is staffed by the Canada Border Services Agency (CBSA). CBSA officers at this airport can handle general aviation aircraft only, with no more than 15 passengers.

References

External links

Certified airports in Ontario
Transport in Manitoulin District
Buildings and structures in Manitoulin District